Geoff Arthur Smith (born March 7, 1969) is a Canadian former professional ice hockey player who played in the National Hockey League from 1989 to 1999.

Playing career
Geoff Smith was drafted in the third round, 63rd overall, in the 1987 NHL Entry Draft by the Edmonton Oilers. He won the Stanley Cup as a rookie with Edmonton in the 1989–90 season. Part way through the 1993–94 NHL season Geoff Smith was traded to the Florida Panthers. Smith remained in the Panthers' organisation until he became a New York Ranger in 1997–98. He retired following his second season with the Rangers.

Coaching career
Smith was an assistant coach with the Western Hockey League's Kamloops Blazers. He was also head coach of the Kamloops Storm of the KIJHL in 2011–12. He stepped down as head coach due to work commitments. He later returned to coach two seasons of midget hockey with the Thompson Blazers for 2016-2018.

Personal
Smith is married with two children. He owns a 20-acre farm outside Kamloops, British Columbia where he breeds and sells thoroughbreds.

Career statistics

Regular season and playoffs

International

Awards and honours

References

External links

1969 births
Living people
Canadian ice hockey defencemen
Carolina Monarchs players
Cincinnati Cyclones (IHL) players
Edmonton Oilers draft picks
Edmonton Oilers players
Florida Panthers players
Hartford Wolf Pack players
Kamloops Blazers players
Ice hockey people from Edmonton
New York Rangers players
St. Albert Saints players
Stanley Cup champions
North Dakota Fighting Hawks men's ice hockey players
Worcester IceCats players